Kateřina Průšová (born 1 December 1983 in Liberec) is a beauty pageant titleholder who won Miss Czech Republic 2002 as an 18-year-old. She was due to participate at the Miss Universe 2003 pageant, but was replaced by Kateřina Smržová due to Průšová not being able to speak English properly.

While being married to Vladimír Konvalinka (2008 − 2011), she used the double surname, Konvalinka Průšová

References 

1983 births
Living people
People from Liberec
Czech beauty pageant winners
Czech female models